Family with sequence similarity 20, member C also known as FAM20C or DMP4 is a protein which in humans is encoded by the FAM20C gene. Fam20C, a Golgi localized protein kinase, is a serine kinase that phosphorylates both casein and other highly acidic proteins and members of the small integrin-binding ligand, the N-linked glycoproteins (SIBLING) family at the target motif SerXGlu.

Function 

Dmp4 causes differentiation of mesenchymal stem cells into functional odontoblast cells and is likely to function as a regulator of dentin mineralization. FAM20C is a secretory kinase, responsible for the phosphorylation of all secreted proteins, from milk to bone proteins. Phosphorylation by Fam20C in the secretory pathway is essential for proper biomineralization of bone. The substrate specificity of FAM20C indicates, however, that it is not likely to account for the tyrosine phosphorylation of the secreted protein. The characterization of FAM20C as an active serine kinase in the Golgi apparatus provides a clear precedent that ATP dependent protein phosphorylation can take place in the secretory apparatus. Fam20C knockout mice develop severe hypophosphatemic rickets due to an increased renal phosphate wasting that is likely attributed to the remarkable elevation of serum fibroblast growth factor 23 (FGF23), while their dentin and enamel defects are largely independent from the hypophosphatemia and appear to be a local effects of phosphorylation failure in the secretory calcium-binding phosphoproteins (SCPPs)

Clinical significance 

Mutations in the FAM20C gene are associated with Raine syndrome.

References

Further reading